Bahtiyar Hamrakulovich Hojaahmedov (born 14 February 1985) is a Turkmen footballer who plays for Turkmen club Energetik Mary. He was part of the Turkmenistan national team from 2008.

Club career 
In 2013 with FC Balkan he won the AFC-President's Cup 2013 in Malaysia.

In 2014, he moved to the FC Altyn Asyr.

The season of 2019 began in FC Merw. In the summer transfer window moved to Şagadam FK.

In summer 2021 Hojaahmedow, as a free agent, signed a contract with FC Merw.

In March 2022, FC Energetik Mary announced the signing of Hojaahmedow.

Achievements 
 AFC President's Cup: 2013

References

External links 
 
 

1986 births
Living people
Turkmenistan footballers
Turkmenistan international footballers
Association football defenders
Expatriate footballers in Uzbekistan
Turkmenistan expatriate sportspeople in Uzbekistan
Turkmenistan expatriate footballers
Buxoro FK players